Astelia alpina called pineapple grass, silver astelia, or perching lily is a commonly found species in alpine and subalpine areas of Tasmania and the Australian Alps. It is a perennial herb that typically dominates its environment by growing in dense clusters, called mats, in alpine bogs. There are two subspecies: Astelia alpina var. novae hollandiae from New South Wales and Victoria and Astelia alpina var. alpina endemic to Tasmania. Both subspecies appear very similar to each other. The species was originally described by Robert Brown.

Description 
Pineapple grass has green leaves with silvery, hairy undersides, appearing similar to the vegetative leaves of a pineapple plant. The leaves up to 30 cm long, 2–3 cm wide, tapering to a point at the end. Leaves are stiff and have recurved margins. The lower surface is covered with many fine white hairs, called trichomes, while the upper surface is green with the occasional hair. When viewed under the microscope, each trichome has a base of two glandular cells that stains dark. Flowers are small and white-green. When present at the base of the leaves, fruits are red ovals about 12mm long, fleshy, and edible. The male panicle has 10-60 flowers, while the female panicle has a maximum of 30 flowers.

Taxonomy 
The word Astelia comes from Greek, where "a" means without and "stele" means trunk, referring to the very small stem and style. Alpinus comes from Latin, in reference to its preferred habitat. It is normally known as pineapple grass because its vegetative growth looks like pineapple leaves, but has also been called silver astelia, perching lily, and very rarely, artichoke.

Despite its common name, pineapple grass is not a grass, and is more closely related to the lilies. Based on the current taxonomy for Asteliaceae, Astelia alpina's closest relatives include A. subulata, A. solandri, A. grandis, A. nervosa, A. chathamica, and A. fragrans. More recent genetic studies, however, indicate that the current taxonomy is not monophyletic, and reclassification is required. This classification suggests that A. alpina var. alpina is as closely related to A. alpina var. novaehollandiae as it is to A. papuana, A. linearis var. linearis, A. subulata, and A. linearis var. novae-zelandiae. It is also closely related to A. hemichrysa, but a major branch point exists separating it from the other species of Astelia.

Reproduction 
Flowers appear on pineapple grass in summer on structures called racemes. The plant is dioecious, meaning it has separate male and female flowers. Like other species of Astelia, which grow in areas that are moist and humid, the ovary is full of mucilage, which is thought to function in pollen transmittance. Humans can facilitate asexual reproduction by breaking apart mature clumps and planting them separately. Males produce more flowers and inflorescences than females.

Distribution and habitat 

Pineapple grass is commonly found in the subalpine and alpine areas of Tasmania and the Australian Alps. In these habitats, plants must be tough to survive the harsh wind exposure, hot sun in summer, and freezing in winter. The Tasmanian species typically dominates alpine sedgeland and is found on all mountains in Tasmania. It prefers moist soils, and often occurs together with the coral fern (Gleichenia alpina), and other alpine plants including Empodisma minus, Carpha alpina, and Restio australis.

Ecology 
Astelia alpina is often a pioneer species following fires in alpina areas. Alpine herbland and sedgeland is typically dominated by Astelia alpina 10–20 years after a fire, a community that generally replaces deciduous and coniferous heath. Western alpine sedgeland in Tasmania is less dependent on fire to exist than sedgelands in eastern Tasmania. It has a variable form and dominance depending on location and habitat (Table 1).

Table 1: Description of vegetative coverage by Pineapple Grass, Astelia alpina, in different locations. Different locations display different form and dominance patterns.

Conservation 
This species is not considered to be at risk in the wild. The community it dominates, alpine sedgeland, is classified as Highland Treeless Vegetation, which is most threatened by fires, and pressures associated with bushwalkers.

Uses and cultivation 
Pineapple grass is not widely cultivated, but the berries are edible. It prefers high altitude conditions with wet soil and plenty of light. If it is being grown at low altitudes, it is more suited to colder climates. Seed collection from native plants is possible. The 1889 book 'The Useful Native Plants of Australia records that "The fruit is sweet, and the bases of the leaves are eaten".

References

External links 
 http://anpsa.org.au
 www.utas.edu.au/dicotkey

Asteliaceae
Flora of New South Wales
Flora of Tasmania
Flora of Victoria (Australia)
Perennial plants
Dioecious plants